The Hochmaderer is a prominent mountain, 2,823 metres high, in the  Silvretta in the Austrian state of Vorarlberg, at the end of the Montafon valley. The multi-peaked block of primitive rock drops in mighty precipices to the south and east.

The mountain may be ascended from the lake of Vermuntsee (1,743 m / 3½ hours) or from the Tübinger Hut (2,190 m / 2¾ hours) up the little valley of Gantschettatäli (2,300 m) to the south and the Hochmadererjoch saddle (2,505 m / 1 hour).

Mountains of the Alps
Two-thousanders of Austria
Mountains of Vorarlberg
Silvretta Alps